Collège Notre-Dame may refer to:
 Collège Notre-Dame (Haiti)
 Collège Notre-Dame (Sudbury), Ontario, Canada
 Collège Notre Dame de Jamhour, Lebanon
 Collège Notre-Dame du Sacré-Cœur, in Montreal, Canada

See also 
 
 Notre Dame High School (disambiguation)